Louis Burns may refer to:

Louis F. Burns (1920–2012), American author and historian of the Osage Nation
Louis Henry Burns (1878–1928), United States federal judge

See also
Burns (surname)